He Yaling (born September 1963) is a Chinese physicist who is a professor at Xi'an Jiaotong University, and an academician of the Chinese Academy of Sciences.

She was a representative of the 20th National Congress of the Chinese Communist Party. She was an alternate member of the 19th Central Committee of the Chinese Communist Party and is an alternate member of the 20th Central Committee of the Chinese Communist Party.

Biography
He Yaling was born in Xi'an, Shaanxi, in September 1963. After graduating from Xi'an Jiaotong University in 1985, she stayed and taught at the university. She was honored as a Distinguished Young Scholar by the National Science Fund for Distinguished Young Scholars in 2004.

Publications

Honours and awards
 2004 State Natural Science Award (Second Class)
 2009 State Technological Invention Award (Second Class)
 2012 State Natural Science Award (Second Class)
 2015 Science and Technology Progress Award of the Ho Leung Ho Lee Foundation
 October 2015 Member of the Chinese Academy of Sciences (CAS)

References

1963 births
Living people
People from Xi'an
Scientists from Shaanxi
Xi'an Jiaotong University alumni
Academic staff of Xi'an Jiaotong University
Chinese physicists
Members of the Chinese Academy of Sciences
Alternate members of the 19th Central Committee of the Chinese Communist Party
Alternate members of the 20th Central Committee of the Chinese Communist Party